Keith railway station is a railway station serving the town of Keith, Moray, Scotland.

History

The station was originally owned by the Highland Railway and was known as Keith Junction, the line from the west having opened by the Inverness and Aberdeen Junction Railway in 1858 and becoming part of the Highland Railway in 1865. It was the point where the line from  made an end-on junction with the Great North of Scotland Railway from Aberdeen (which opened in 1856) to enable exchange of goods and passengers. It was taken over by the London, Midland and Scottish Railway at the 1923 Grouping and then became part of the Scottish Region of British Railways upon nationalisation in 1948.

Today only a single platform remains in full-time use, though the Dufftown branch platform (numbered 1) is available if required for turning back trains from the Aberdeen direction (though no trains are scheduled to do so in the current timetable). The bays have been filled in, having been abandoned and tracks lifted in the early 1970s after the closure of the Moray Coast Line (for which the station was a terminus). A signal box (which retains the name Keith Junction) remains at the eastern end to control a passing loop on the single track main line beyond the station, the now little-used goods yard (formerly used by trains accessing the nearby Chivas Regal whisky plant) and the stub of the Dufftown branch.

Keith's other station, was on the Great North of Scotland Railway branch line to Dufftown (first opened in 1862) and subsequently extended to  via  - this was much nearer the centre of Keith than the Junction station.

The Dufftown and Craigellachie line was closed to passengers by British Railways in May 1968 as a result of the Beeching Axe. The line has since been preserved as the Keith and Dufftown Railway (reopening in 2000/01), but the link between it and the national network was severed by Railtrack in 1998 - two 60-foot track panels having been removed as a condition of the transfer of the branch to the K&DR. The preservation society hopes to reinstate the connection and the still-extant but disused section beyond to Keith Town at some point in the future and run through trains from here to Dufftown, which would see platform 1 return to regular use. Discussions with regard to this were held between the K&DRA, the local MSP Richard Lochhead and Transport Scotland in the autumn of 2015.

The old station buildings were replaced by new ones in 1988 in a rebuilding programme costing £200,000.

Facilities 
The station has good facilities for its rural location, with a part-time-staffed ticket office, accessible toilet, ticket machine, two car parks, bench, bike racks and help point. The station has four methods of step-free access.

Passenger Volume 

The statistics cover twelve month periods that start in April.

Services

As of May 2022, There is a basic two-hourly frequency in each directions (with peak extras), to  northbound and  southbound, giving a total of 11 trains each way. The first departure to Aberdeen each weekday and Saturday continues south to Edinburgh Waverley, and another continues to Stonehaven in the evening. On Sundays there are five trains each way.

Future Proposals

In addition to the potential reinstatement of the Dufftown branch, Transport Scotland have published proposals to improve the facilities here. This could see the existing passing loop extended through the station and a second platform built north of the current one. Other upgrades planned for the station include a bus interchange, taxi drop-off point and car park extension.

References

External Links

Railscot - Keith

Railway stations in Moray
Former Highland Railway stations
Railway stations in Great Britain opened in 1856
Railway stations served by ScotRail
Former Great North of Scotland Railway stations
1856 establishments in Scotland
Keith, Moray